Andrei Denisov (born June 3, 1963) is an Israeli Olympic weightlifter.

Denisov is Jewish.

Denisov competed for Israel at the 1992 Summer Olympics at the age of 29 in Barcelona, Spain, in Weightlifting—Men's Heavyweight (100 kg), and came in 6th, lifting 377.5 kg.

References

1963 births
Living people
Israeli Jews
Jewish weightlifters
Israeli male weightlifters
Weightlifters at the 1992 Summer Olympics
Olympic weightlifters of Israel